Riaño may refer to one of the following places in Spain:

Riaño, León, in the province of León
Riaño, a locality of the municipality of Valle de Valdebezana
Riaño, a locality of the municipality of Solórzano
Riaño de Ibio, a locality of the municipality of Mazcuerras
Riaño de Campoo, a parish in the municipality of Hermandad de Campoo de Suso 
Riaño (Langreo), a parish in the municipality of Langreo